The mappiq (also mapiq, mapik, mappik, lit. "causing to go out") is a diacritic used in the Hebrew alphabet. It is part of the Masoretes' system of niqqud (vowel points), and was added to Hebrew orthography at the same time. It takes the form of a dot in the middle of a letter (usually , he). An identical point with a different phonetic function (marking different consonants) is called a dagesh.

The mappiq is used to indicate that the corresponding letter is to be pronounced as a consonant, although in a position where the letter usually indicates a vowel.

Before the vowel points were invented, some consonants were used to indicate vowel sounds. These consonants are called matres lectionis. The letter he (transliterated H) at the end of a word (Hebrew is written from right to left) can indicate the vowel sound a or e. When it does, it is not acting as a consonant, and therefore in pure phonetic logic the Biblical name Zechariah (among others) should be spelled "Zekharya" without the final "h".  However, silent final h being also a feature of English, it is usually retained in Hebrew transliterations to distinguish final he from final aleph.

The divine name Yah has a mappiq (a dot inside the last letter), so the last letter shall not be read as a vowel a, but as the consonant H - and therefore Yah (and not Ya).

The most common occurrence of mappiq is in the suffix "-ah", meaning "her".

A he with mappiq is meant to be pronounced as a full consonant "h". In Mizrahi and Yemenite Hebrew it is pronounced more strongly than a normal he, sometimes with a slight following shwa sound (this rule is also followed by Dutch Sephardim), and in Ashkenazi Hebrew, it is pronounced . In modern Hebrew, however, it is normally silent; although it is still pronounced in religious contexts by careful readers of the prayers and scriptures.

Rafe 

In Masoretic manuscripts the opposite of a mappiq would be indicated by a rafe, a small line on top of the letter.  This is no longer found in Hebrew.

See also
 Hebrew alphabet
 Hebrew phonology
 Mater lectionis
 Rafe

References

Niqqud